Caroline Cruveillier (born 23 March 1998) is a French boxer.

She won a medal at the 2019 AIBA Women's World Boxing Championships.

References

1998 births
Living people
AIBA Women's World Boxing Championships medalists
French women boxers
Bantamweight boxers
20th-century French women
21st-century French women